HRE Mazowsze Serce Polski is a Polish UCI Continental cycling team founded in 2017.

On 12 May 2021, HRE Investments, a Polish real estate company, was announced as a co-title sponsor.

Team roster

Major results
2018
Stage 1 Szlakiem Walk Majora Hubala, Kamil Zieliński
Stage 2 Tour of Małopolska, Vitaliy Buts
2020
Grand Prix Alanya, Paweł Bernas
Grand Prix Manavgat-Side, Alan Banaszek
 Overall In the footsteps of the Romans, Norbert Banaszek
Stage 1, Norbert Banaszek
Stage 1 Tour of Bulgaria, Alan Banaszek
Stage 4 Tour of Bulgaria, Norbert Banaszek
 Overall Tour of Szeklerland, Jakub Kaczmarek
Prologue, Adrian Kurek
Stage 2, Jakub Kaczmarek
Stage 2 Tour of Serbia, Emanuel Piaskowy
 Overall Belgrade–Banja Luka, Jakub Kaczmarek
Stage 2, Jakub Kaczmarek
Stage 4 Giro della Friuli Venezia Giulia, Paweł Bernas
2021
Stage 3 Istrian Spring Trophy, Mihkel Räim
Prologue International Tour of Rhodes, Marceli Bogusławski
 Overall Belgrade–Banja Luka, Mihkel Räim
Stage 4, Mihkel Räim
 National Road Race championship, Mihkel Räim
Prologue Tour of Bulgaria, Marceli Bogusławski
Stage 3 Tour of Bulgaria, Mihkel Räim
GP Slovakia, Alan Banaszek
 Overall Tour of Szeklerland, Alan Banaszek
Stage 2, Alan Banaszek
Stage 3 Szlakiem Grodów Piastowskich, Jakub Kaczmarek
 Overall Tour of Romania, Jakub Kaczmarek
Stage 1 Tour de Serbie, Alan Banaszek
2022
 Overall Tour of Thailand, Alan Banaszek
Stage 1, Marceli Boguslawski
Stage 2, Alan Banaszek
 Overall Belgrade–Banja Luka, Jakub Kaczmarek
Stage 1 (TTT) 
Stage 3, Jakub Kaczmarek
Stage 4, Alan Banaszek
Grand Prix Nasielsk-Serock, Marceli Boguslawski

National champions
2021
 Estonia Road Race, Mihkel Räim

References

External links
 

Cycling teams based in Poland
UCI Continental Teams (Europe)
2017 establishments in Poland